Taylor Cameron Carpenter (born 18 April 1981) is an American organist and composer. In 2009, he became the first organist to ever be nominated for a Grammy Award for his solo album, Revolutionary.

Biography
Taylor Cameron Carpenter was born in the state of Pennsylvania, United States.

He attended high school at the University of North Carolina School of the Arts, and has bachelor's and master's degrees from the Juilliard School in New York, having studied with Gerre Hancock, John Weaver, and Paul Jacobs. Though he is not religious, Carpenter was from 2008 to 2009 the artist-in-residence at Middle Collegiate Church in New York's East Village, where he played a four-manual electronic organ that he designed for the broad-ranging music of that church. Carpenter ended his residency in July 2009.

Recordings
In early 2008, the Telarc record label signed Carpenter to an exclusive five-album recording contract. His Telarc debut album, Revolutionary, was recorded as a CD and DVD at Trinity Church Wall Street in New York City and released September 23, 2008. The title comes from Carpenter's transcription of Chopin's "Revolutionary Etude". The album made Carpenter the first organist ever to receive a Grammy nomination in the category 'Best Solo Instrumental Performance' (without orchestra) for a solo album. His first commercial album was a 2006 CD/DVD, Pictures at an Exhibition, on SeeMusicDVD. It includes his arrangement of the programmatic piano work by Modest Mussorgsky, and his own improvisatory "New York City Sessions". Visuals for the Mussorgsky were created by Marshall Yaeger and his Kaleidoplex. The recording was made at Trinity Church, New York.

An "early" recording, made in 2005 and financed by the Allen Organ Company, was titled notes from the underground.  This recording was a highly unusual project for Allen, as Carpenter was given near-complete artistic control of the album, selection of the program, and even oversight of graphic design (featuring location shots of Carpenter at famous New York City graffiti sites). This album was not reissued by Allen and is now a rarity.

On June 1, 2010, Telarc issued in the U.S. a two-disc set with a CD carrying a J.S. Bach recital that had been recorded live at a recital he played in the Church of St. Mary the Virgin in New York City.

On August 26, 2014, Sony issued the DVD If You Could Read My Mind, containing performances and commentary by Carpenter recorded on an electronic touring organ.

Work
Carpenter has been both criticized by some and praised by others for his unorthodox interpretations of the standard organ repertoire. Registrations rarely follow those suggested by the composer, and Carpenter often takes dramatic liberties in articulation. Carpenter is also noted for his advocacy of the digital organ, particularly development of a touring electronic organ, citing factors such as the obstacles the pipe organ imposes on the ability of a traveling performer to enjoy an ongoing relationship with a single instrument in the same manner as many other instrumentalists. Despite this, he frequently performs on pipe organs, often garnering major exposure for the instrument.

He designed and commissioned the International Touring Organ (ITO), Opus 8 of the Marshall and Ogletree company, a one-of-a-kind, customized, “full-scale portable organ sonically tailorable to any acoustic environment”, which took ten years and cost $2 million to build. Since its premiere in March 2014, he no longer has to learn a new instrument for every performance which he characterized as maddening, and he now tours worldwide to venues that have never had an organ. The story of the ITO is the subject of the 2015 documentary "The Sound of My Life".

On March 18, 2014, Carpenter, arriving at Birmingham Airport for a performance at Birmingham Symphony Hall the following day, was refused permission to enter the United Kingdom by the British Border Force which applied immigration rules for visiting foreign artists. He returned to Britain the following day, and after a short detention at the airport, performed a reduced version of his planned recital. The House of Lords initiated an inquiry with the Home Office which determined that Carpenter lacked the required sponsor's certificate and that no mistreatment occurred, though it conceded that "Although the guidelines and policies were correctly followed by officers, Border Force accepts that more could have been done to assist Mr Carpenter."

Personal life
Carpenter has been identified as bisexual. In a New York Times interview, it was reported, "Mr. Carpenter... describes his sexuality as 'radically inclusive.

References

External links

 

1981 births
Living people
American classical organists
American male organists
Queer men
American LGBT musicians
LGBT classical musicians
Bisexual musicians
Bisexual men
Pedal piano players
Place of birth missing (living people)
21st-century pianists
21st-century organists
21st-century American male musicians
21st-century American keyboardists
20th-century American LGBT people
21st-century American LGBT people
Male classical organists